Red Moon is a free software application for the Android operating system, designed to filter blue light from the device's display, helping reduce eye strain during night-time use and disruption of sleep patterns. It allows for independent adjustment of colour temperature, luminosity and filter level, making it also possible to lower the effective screen brightness below the usual minimum brightness level of the device. Red Moon does not require root.

See also 

 List of free and open-source Android applications
 Redshift (software)
Night Shift (software)
Electronic media and sleep
Light effects on circadian rhythm
Delayed sleep phase disorder

References

External links 

 Source code
 
 Red Moon at Google Play

Free and open-source Android software
Software using the GPL license